Zeesen is a village south of Königs Wusterhausen in Germany, known for Deutschlandsender Zeesen, which was built in 1927, and the Zeesen short-wave transmitter.

Villages in Brandenburg